British NVC community MC12 (Festuca rubra – Hyacinthoides non-scripta maritime bluebell community) is one of the maritime cliff communities in the British National Vegetation Classification system. It is one of five communities categorised as maritime sea-cliff grasslands.

This community is found locally in western coastal areas of Britain. There are two subcommunities.

Community composition

Four constant species are found in this community:
 Red fescue, Festuca rubra
 Bluebell, Hyacinthoides non-scripta
 Common sorrel, Rumex acetosa
 Yorkshire-fog, Holcus lanatus

One rare species, spring squill (Scilla verna), is associated with this community.

Distribution

This community is found locally in coastal areas in the west of Britain from Devon and Cornwall north to Skye.

Subcommunities

There are two subcommunities:
 the Armeria maritima subcommunity
 the Ranunculus ficaria subcommunity

References

 John S. Rodwell (2000) British Plant Communities Volume 5 - Maritime communities and vegetation of open habitats  (hardback),  (paperback)

MC12